Jaime Camilo González Vidal (born 15 April 1977) is a former Chilean  professional footballer who played as a forward for clubs in his country and for Bari in Italy. He has been coach of San Antonio Unido.

Career
Between 2001 to 2002, he played on loan at Universidad Católica from Bari. 

In 2011, he worked as manager of San Antonio Unido in the Chilean Tercera A.

Honours
Universidad Católica
 Primera División de Chile: 2002 Apertura

Cobreloa
 Primera División de Chile: 2003 Apertura, 2003 Clausura

References

External links
 

1977 births
Living people
People from San Antonio, Chile
Chilean footballers
Association football forwards
O'Higgins F.C. footballers
Colo-Colo footballers
S.S.C. Bari players
Club Deportivo Universidad Católica footballers
Cobreloa footballers
Audax Italiano footballers
C.D. Huachipato footballers
Primera B de Chile players
Chilean Primera División players
Serie A players
Serie B players
Chilean expatriate footballers
Chilean expatriate sportspeople in Italy
Expatriate footballers in Italy
Chilean football managers